Lesnes Abbey  is a former abbey, now ruined, in Abbey Wood, in the London Borough of Bexley, southeast London, England. It is a scheduled  monument, and the abbey's ruins are listed at Grade II by Historic England. 

The adjacent Lesnes Abbey Woods are a Local Nature Reserve. Part of the wood is the Abbey Wood SSSI, a geological Site of Special Scientific Interest which is an important site for early Tertiary fossils.

History
After the Norman Conquest in 1066, the area of Lesnes, close to the town of Erith, passed into the possession of Bishop Odo, and was mentioned in the Domesday Book of 1086 as Loisnes in the Hundred of Litlelai. The year 1178 saw the foundation of the Abbey of St Mary and St Thomas the Martyr at Lesnes, on a site now located in the suburbs of southeast London to the north of the ancient but long-managed Lesnes Abbey Woods that are named after it, where the land rises above what would originally have been marshland.

Lesnes Abbey, as it is now known, was founded by Richard de Luci, Chief Justiciar of England, in 1178. This may have been in penance for his role in the protracted conflict between Henry II and Thomas Becket, the Archbishop of Canterbury, which culminated in the latter's murder in 1170 by four of the kings' knights. In 1179, de Luci resigned his office and retired to the abbey, where he died three months later. He was buried in the chapter house.

In 1381 Abel Ker of Erith led a local uprising during the Peasants' Revolt, a rebellion which initially broke out in the neighbouring county of Essex. A group from Erith forced their way into nearby Lesnes Abbey and made the abbot to swear an oath to support them. They subsequently marched to Maidstone to join the main body of men led by Wat Tyler.

The Abbot of Lesnes Abbey was an important local landlord, and took a leading part in draining the marshland. However, this and the cost of maintaining river embankments was one of the reasons given for the Abbey's chronic financial difficulties. It never became a large community, and was closed by Cardinal Wolsey in 1525, under a licence to suppress monasteries of less than seven inmates. It was one of the first monasteries to be closed after the Dissolution of the Monasteries in 1534, and the monastic buildings were all demolished, except for the Abbott's Lodging. Henry Cooke acquired the site in 1541 and it eventually passed to Sir John Hippersley who salvaged building materials, before selling the property to Thomas Hawes of London in 1632. It was then bequeathed to Christ's Hospital in 1633. Some of the stone is said to have been used in the construction of Hall Place in nearby Bexley.

The abbey was effectively lost and the area became farmland, with the abbot's house forming part of a farmhouse. In modern times it has been restored to show some of the walls and the entire outline of the abbey is visible giving a good idea of the size and atmosphere of the original place. It is located on the Green Chain Walk and surrounded by parkland and an ornamental garden. There is a café and a small exhibition of the abbey and toilet facilities for visitors.

There is a large externally propped mulberry tree (Morus nigra) at the northern side of the abbey.

The site was excavated by Woolwich & District Antiquarian Society in about 1909 to 1910. Some archaeological finds from the Abbey's site are displayed in Greenwich Heritage Centre, Artillery Square at Woolwich SE18 4DX, others are further east in the museum in Erith Library 100 High Street DA8 1SL. The Missale de Lesnes is in the library of the Victoria & Albert Museum in South Kensington, London.

The former London County Council purchased the site of the ruins in 1930, which were opened to the public as a park in 1931. Since 1986, the site has been the property of the London Borough of Bexley. A branch of the Green Chain Walk passes the ruins on its way from Oxleas Wood to Thamesmead riverside.

Burials at Lesnes Abbey
Richard de Luci was buried at the abbey on 14 July 1179.

Lesnes Abbey ward

Lesnes Abbey gives its name to one of the London Borough of Bexley's 21 electoral wards. The ruins themselves are in the north of Lesnes Abbey ward. Woolwich Road, the A206 road, cuts through the middle of the ward spanning east to west; the A2041 road spans north to south marking the ward's western boundary. West Heath is located within the ward to the south of Woolwich road. The population of the ward at the 2011 census was 11,346.

Gallery

See also
Lesnes Abbey Woods
Lessness Heath

References

External links

Bexley Abbey ruins, London Borough of Bexley
Lesnes Abbey Conservation Volunteers (LACV)

1178 establishments in England
1525 disestablishments in England
Christian monasteries disestablished in the 16th century
Christian monasteries established in the 12th century
Former buildings and structures in the London Borough of Bexley
Grade II listed buildings in the London Borough of Bexley
Monasteries in London
Ruined abbeys and monasteries
Ruins in London
Scheduled monuments in London
Tourist attractions in the London Borough of Bexley
Peasants' Revolt